"San Tropez" is the fourth track from the album Meddle by the band Pink Floyd. This song was one of several to be considered for the band's "best of" album, Echoes: The Best of Pink Floyd.

Writing
Unlike the other tracks on Meddle, "San Tropez" was not written collaboratively; instead, Roger Waters wrote the piece himself and brought it into the studio already finished. It is the only track on Meddle not co-written by David Gilmour. This song is about a place called Saint-Tropez, a commune of the Var département in southern France located on the French Riviera. The song reflects an idealised vision of what a day in Saint-Tropez might be like.

Misunderstood lyric
Throughout the 1970s and beyond, the second-to-last line of lyrics to the song, "Making a date for later by phone", has been persistently misunderstood in Italy, mainly because of Waters' slurred pronunciation ("...fer-lita-pah-fon"), as being "Making a date for Rita Pavone", with a reference to the well-known 1960s Italian pop singer. Pavone herself has stated several times, in TV interviews and elsewhere, that she actually believes the line to be about her.

Recording
While Roger Waters plays the acoustic guitar as well as his usual bass, "San Tropez" does include a short slide guitar solo from guitarist David Gilmour and an extended piano solo by keyboardist Richard Wright at the end.

Reception
In a review for the Meddle album, Jean-Charles Costa of Rolling Stone described "San Tropez", along with "A Pillow of Winds", as an "ozone ballad". He further described the two as "pleasant little acoustic numbers hovering over a bizarre back-drop of weird sounds." Classic Rock Review described "San Tropez" as "a jazz-inflected pop song with a shuffle tempo." They went on further saying "[San Tropez] adds another diverse dimension to the album with its easy-going crooner-like melody and atmosphere."

Personnel
Roger Waters – vocals, acoustic guitar, bass guitar
David Gilmour – slide guitar
Richard Wright – piano
Nick Mason – drums and percussion

References

Pink Floyd songs
1971 songs
Songs written by Roger Waters
Song recordings produced by David Gilmour
Song recordings produced by Roger Waters
Song recordings produced by Richard Wright (musician)
Song recordings produced by Nick Mason
Songs about France